Present Day Memories is an EP by the Chicago, Illinois punk rock band The Lawrence Arms and the San Francisco, California ska punk band The Chinkees, released in 2001 by Asian Man Records. It is considered a "split" CD in that each band contributes several songs. It is now out of print, however all of the Lawrence Arms tracks have been reissued on their B-sides album Cocktails & Dreams. This is the release that got Fat Mike interested in signing The Lawrence Arms to his label, Fat Wreck Chords.

Track listing
Side 1: The Lawrence Arms
"Quincentuple Your Money" 3:22
"100 Resolutions" 3:31
"There's No Place Like a Stranger's Floor" 3:24
"Hey, What Time is 'Pensacola: Wings of Gold' on Anyway?" 4:20
Side 2: The Chinkees
"Clouding Up My Storm" 1:33
"1980s Drowning Me" 1:48
"Heart + Me" 1:47
"Run for Help" 1:25
"Present Day Memories" 3:10

Performers
The Lawrence Arms
Chris McCaughan - guitar, vocals
Brendan Kelly - bass, vocals
Neil Hennessy - drums

The Chinkees
Mike Park - vocals, guitar, keyboards
Greg Alesandro - guitar, drums, backing vocals
Jason Thinh - guitar
Miya Zane Osaki - bass, backing vocals
Steve Choi - keyboards

Album information
Record label: Asian Man Records
The Lawrence Arms tracks recorded at Atlas Studios in January 2001 by Matt Allison

The Lawrence Arms albums
The Chinkees albums
2001 EPs
Split EPs
Asian Man Records EPs